Badlya (or Badliya) is a census town in Ajmer tehsil of Ajmer district of Rajasthan state in India. The census town and village falls under Badlya gram panchayat.

Demography
As per 2011 census of India, Badlya  has population of 5,111 of which 2,671 are males and 2,440 are females. Sex ratio of the census town and village is 914.

Transportation
Badlya is connected by air (Kishangarh Airport), by train (Madar railway station) and by road.

See also
Ajmer Tehsil
Madar railway station

References

Census towns in Ajmer district
Cities and towns in Ajmer district